Helicopsis  filimargo is a species of air-breathing land snail, terrestrial pulmonate gastropod mollusc in the family Geomitridae from Eastern Europe.

Taxonomy 
This species is extremely variable and many forms, especially from Crimea, were treated as separate species before revision using methods of molecular taxonomy was carried.

Synonyms of Helicopsis  filimargo that were previously treated as species include (among many other):
 Helicopsis  arenosa (Krynicki, 1836), equal to Helicopsis  dejecta (Rossmässler, 1838)
 Helicopsis  retowskii (Clessin, 1883)
 Helicopsis  gasprensis (Hesse, 1934), equal to Helicopsis  paulhessei (Lindholm, 1936)
 Helicopsis  subfilimargo Gural-Sverlova, 2010
 Helicopsis  martynovi Gural-Sverlova, 2010
 Helicopsis  luganica Gural-Sverlova, 2010

Distribution 
This species occurs in Southern and Eastern Ukraine and in the adjacent regions of Russia. Most numerous and diverse populations are in the Crimean Mountains. All reports of H. filimargo outside those regions were referring to various other species of Geomitridae.

References

Geomitridae
Molluscs described in 1833